Awa Matilda Isakine Santesson-Sey (born 6 July 1997), known professionally as AWA, is a Swedish singer based in London. Her father is Senegalese, her mother Swedish.

At age 12, deciding she wanted to study classical music, she applied to and later attended Adolf Fredrik's Music School in Stockholm.

Career
AWA was the winner of the first series of the Swedish version of The X Factor in 2012, at age 15. In 2013, she won a Nickelodeon Kids' Choice Award and released the single "Not Ready to Say Goodbye". Taking her time to work out her sound, she released the single "Obvious" in 2015. During this time, AWA worked with producers and collaborators including Aston Rudi and Show N Prove.

In 2019, AWA was signed to Columbia Records. She has released three songs on the label, with a five-track EP expected in 2020. "F**kin' Love Songs (ft. Ebenezer)" was premiered by Julie Adenuga on Beats 1 and was Yasmin Evans' 'Track of the Week' on BBC Radio 1Xtra. Complex premiered the official video. In November 2019, Vevo named AWA one of its "Artists to Watch" for 2020.

Discography

Singles

References

The X Factor winners
X Factor (Swedish TV series) contestants
Swedish people of Senegalese descent
1997 births
Living people
21st-century Swedish singers
21st-century Swedish women singers
English-language singers from Sweden